Fekri Hassan is a geoarchaeologist. After studying geology and anthropology, Hassan commenced teaching at Washington State University department of Anthropology in 1974. From 1988 to 1990 he acted as advisor to the Ministry of Culture of Egypt. Currently professor  emeritus, he had formerly held the chair of Petrie Professor of Archaeology (1994-2008) of the Institute of Archaeology and department of Egyptology of University College London. Program Director Master's of Cultural Heritage Management, French University of Egypt in partnership with the Paris-Sorbonne University. Editor of the African Archaeological Review  journal, contributory editor of The Review of Archaeology he is also honorary president  of the Egyptian Cultural Heritage Organisation.

Selected works

References 

Year of birth missing (living people)
Living people
Egyptian archaeologists
Academics of University College London
Wayne State University faculty
French University of Egypt